Wood Brothers Racing is an American professional stock car racing team that currently competes in the NASCAR Cup Series. The team was formed in 1950 by eponymous brothers Glen and Leonard Wood. From 2006 to 2008, the team was merged with Tad and Jodi Geschickter's JTG Racing. The Wood Brothers Racing Team holds the unique distinction of being the oldest active team in NASCAR, having fielded cars since 1950. They are known for their long relationship with Ford Motor Company, and the long-standing use of the number 21 on their main car. The team currently fields the No. 21 Ford Mustang full-time for Harrison Burton and has a technical alliance with Team Penske.

Cup Series

Car No. 21 history
The Wood Brothers Racing Team was formed in 1950 by brothers from the Blue Ridge Mountains of Southwest Virginia. Walter and Ada Wood owned a family farm between Woolwine and Stuart, Virginia. They had five sons (Glen, Leonard, Delano, Clay, and Ray Lee) and one daughter (Crystal). The sons worked with their father as mechanics, farmers, and lumbermen. Glen Wood cut timber and hauled lumber to local sawmills. The boys had a talent for auto mechanics and spent much time at their father's garage. With each brother serving as a mechanic, they formed a stock car racing team. Curtis Turner, a local sawmill operator from nearby Floyd, Virginia, inspired them. Turner became a champion racecar driver with a "win or crash" style and later was co-owner of Charlotte Motor Speedway. Coincidentally, Turner would later drive for the Wood Brothers.

In the early 1950s, none of the brothers wanted to drive, so they asked their friend John Conway, of nearby Stuart, to drive. Unfortunately, he declined the offer. Then they got fellow lumberman, Chris Williams, as their driver. In the early days of stock car racing, teams drove their cars to the track, raced them, and drove them home. Williams and the Wood Brothers bought their first car for $50, inspiring them to number their car No. 50, many years before they adopted their famous No. 21.

Chris Williams and Glen Wood each drove a few races. The team consisted of Williams, some of his brothers, and the Wood brothers. They became successful, winning races at Bowman Gray Stadium in Winston-Salem, North Carolina, and Martinsville Speedway in Martinsville, Virginia.

Shortly after their early success, Chris Williams sold his share of the team to Glen Wood to focus on his lumber business. To fill team slots, the Wood Brothers enlisted help from Stuart area friends and neighbors including Ralph Edwards, a Wood cousin.

Over the early years, the Wood Brothers Racing Team evolved from a weekend hobby into a full-time business. Glen and Leonard worked full-time building and preparing cars, while the other brothers and crew worked nights and weekends apart from their regular jobs. Their first permanent racing shop was at the town limits of Stuart, Virginia.

The team adopted the No. 21 permanently and would become as noted as any number in NASCAR history (along with the Petty No. 43 and Earnhardt No. 3). The Wood Brothers also found themselves lured to the big-ticket cash prizes offered by the growing Superspeedway races in cities such as Daytona, Florida; Charlotte, North Carolina; and Darlington, South Carolina. Glen Wood soon stepped out from behind the wheel of the No. 21 Ford and they began hiring drivers with reputations as winners at the different tracks.

The team soon began competing on the highest levels of the sport. Victories were won with the mechanical genius of the team of brothers, relatives, and friends. Leonard Wood's talent in the engine department soon brought the team acclaim and was second in the early years only to the fabled Holman-Moody engine juggernaut and the Petty racing dynasty of Lee Petty and son Richard Petty.

Innovation
The Wood Brothers invented the modern pit stop. In the early days of all types of motor racing (when service was needed during the race), it was common for drivers to pull into the pits, turn off the car, get out and even smoke a cigarette as the crew took their time changing tires and servicing the cars. The Wood Brothers recognized that limiting the time off the track could increase their position on the track. Thus, they created and perfected what is now known as the pit stop. It is as common to all types of racing as the checkered flag itself.

As other teams noticed that the Wood Brothers were winning races due to their efficient pit stops, these competitors soon copied the Wood method. Not content with being innovators, the Wood team practiced and perfected the pit stop as a form of acrobatic, mechanical, ballet which gave them still further advantage over their competitors.

Other racing organizations noticed the pit stop innovations of the Wood Brothers. In 1965, Ford brought the Wood Brothers team to the Indianapolis 500, to pit the Lotus-Ford team. Their speed and choreography helped Jim Clark win the 1965 500.

1960s international success
With the Indianapolis 500 win, Wood Brothers Racing began to enjoy international acclaim as pioneers and leaders in motorsports. They were featured in Sports Illustrated and many other media of the day. Their rosters of drivers soon became second to none, and their victories were only matched by Richard Petty.

The Wood Brothers signed a long-term sponsorship agreement with Purolator to be their primary sponsor on the No. 21 car. Their drivers before and during this era had included a "Who's Who" of the best in stock car racing. Among those driving for the Wood Brothers team through the mid-1960s were Curtis Turner, Marvin Panch, Fireball Roberts, Parnelli Jones, Tiny Lund, Junior Johnson, Speedy Thompson, Fred Lorenzen, and Cale Yarborough.

In those years, the Wood Brothers also entered a second car, the No. 121, in select events (they entered three cars in at least one race). Open-wheel star Dan Gurney, who enjoyed popular victories in Indy and Formula One racing, was hired by the Wood Brothers to drive in the No. 121 at road course events. The Gurney-Wood combination proved unbeatable, and they dominated the early road courses on the NASCAR circuit by winning every race in which Gurney drove for the Woods. This streak included the Motor Trend 500 at Riverside, California, in which Gurney won with the Wood No. 121 in 1963, 1964, 1965, 1966, and 1968.

In the 1968 season, the Wood Brothers earned over $160,000 in winnings for the single-season, a staggering amount of winning for that period in any form of auto racing.

Dominance
In the early 1970s, the Wood Brothers continued their success. The lightning-quick pit stops and high-powered engines of the No. 21 car proved a formidable challenge to all on the NASCAR circuit. Legendary drivers such as Donnie Allison and open-wheel Indy 500 winner A. J. Foyt also took turns piloting the Wood car.

The team personnel in the Wood shop began to shift as the team raced in more events and traveled greater distances. Glen Wood emerged as the leader and patriarch of the team. Glen's young sons, Eddie and Len, also began working at the shop in menial labor jobs. His brother Delano Wood had evolved into one of the greatest pit crew members, and his skill as a jackman is incomparable even today.  Other family friends soon joined the team, including Cecil Wilson from neighboring Lawsonville, North Carolina.

Modern era

List of drivers 

David Pearson (1972–1979)
In 1972, David Pearson was hired to be the full-time driver of the No. 21 car. This choice would pave the way for one of the most successful strings of victory in motorsports history. Pearson continued driving the car from 1972 to 1979. In only seven years, the team entered 143 races and amassed a staggering 46 wins and 51 poles. Their race winnings surpassed $1.3 million during these seven years with Pearson as the driver.

In 1976, with Pearson still driving, the Wood Brothers won the coveted "Triple-Crown" of NASCAR racing. This feat was accomplished by winning the legendary Daytona 500, the World 600 at Charlotte Motor Speedway, and the Southern 500 at Darlington Raceway. All of this was accomplished throughout the 1976 season.

Due to their incredible success and their qualities as role models and ambassadors of the sport, the Wood Brothers were invited to the White House in the late 1970s at the request of President Jimmy Carter. The occasion made history for these brothers and friends from the small town of Stuart, Virginia.

As NASCAR gained prominence as an emerging sport, the Wood team was soon hailed as tops in their field. They were frequently toasted by and compared to their peers in other sports of the day, including baseball legend Reggie Jackson, football stars Terry Bradshaw and Franco Harris, and basketball greats Julius Erving and Kareem Abdul-Jabbar.

Due to growth and demand, the No. 21 team vacated its former shop for a new home located at the junction of Dobyns Road and Mayo Court in the town of Stuart. This would be the team's home base shop for many years to come.

Neil Bonnett (1979–1982)
The decade of the 1980s saw changes in NASCAR and within the No. 21 team. Pearson parted ways with the team, and was replaced by an emerging talent named Neil Bonnett from Hueytown, Alabama. Bonnett was a member of the "Alabama Gang" which included driving stars Bobby and Donnie Allison, and this would later include Davey Allison and Hut Stricklin.

Bonnett and the Wood Brothers team had a successful relationship, lasting only three and a half seasons and 83 races. This included nine victories and over $700,000 in winnings. During what was known as the "Bonnett Years", Purolator's longtime president Paul Cameron retired and the Wood Brothers' long-term sponsorship with Purolator came to an end, marking one of the most enduring and synonymous sponsorships in the history of NASCAR.

The No. 21 car was then sponsored by National Engineer, a California-based company focused on research and development for multiple industries. This company was owned by flamboyant Warner Hodgdon, who proudly had his name placed on the No. 21 car as its main sponsor. This Hodgdon sponsorship was believed to have been one of the richest deals of its time in NASCAR racing, thus confirming Wood's status as a leader in the sport.

Within the team itself, many of the original members retired from racing. Original team members and brothers Clay and Ray Lee Wood had stepped down years earlier and focused more on their families and other jobs in Patrick County.

As the number of race events increased and the full-time work of running a team grew each season, the Wood Brothers hired younger team members to fill the gaps. Among these were the son of original crew member Jimmy Edwards and the Wood Brothers' cousin Ralph Edwards. Other new members were Curtis Quesinberry and Hylton Tatum of Stuart as well as another young Wood relative Butch Moricle. Other new personnel was drawn from surrounding cities such as the Virginia towns of Danville, and Roanoke.

Also gaining an important role during these years was young Kim Wood, the only daughter of Glen and Bernece Wood. While she was still in high school, Kim started handling administrative duties for the team and would assist her mom in juggling secretarial duties, travel arrangements, and the business side of running the team.

Buddy Baker (1983–1984)

In the mid-1980s, NASCAR entered what is now called the modern era of the sport. Growth in television coverage of the races had evolved from sporadic showings on ABC's Wide World of Sports to full-time coverage of the Daytona 500 by CBS and the full-time live broadcast of races by emerging cable networks such as ESPN and WTBS. NASCAR also obtained permanent corporate sponsorship for the series from the R. J. Reynolds Tobacco Company and the sport's top-level series was changed from Grand National Division to the Winston Cup Series. The company's founder, R. J. Reynolds, was born and raised in Patrick County, only a few miles from the Wood Brothers team's headquarters.

The Modern Era also marked the first-ever quest for points championships by most teams. Since the 1950s many teams only ran select races. Now, however, teams would be required to compete in all events in a scheduled season to compete for the series title and its large cash prize.

The Wood Brothers decided to make the leap to running a full-time schedule. This added enormous work to the team and required a further commitment of time, money, and manpower. This new commitment also saw the departure of Warner Hodgdon and National Engineering as the sponsor, and the Wood Brothers brought Valvoline on board as their chief patron.

In 1983, the legendary driver Buddy Baker was hired to replace a departing Neil Bonnett in the No. 21 car. He and the Woods struggled for the first time in so many years, lasting only two seasons together. This same year, they captured a win at the Firecracker 400 at Daytona International Speedway.

Baker and the Woods soon parted company, along with Valvoline as the sponsor and international star driver Bobby Rahal from the IndyCar series would briefly fill Baker's vacant seat for one race.

Kyle Petty (1985–1988)

The 1985 season made history to NASCAR as young Kyle Petty, the grandson of legendary Lee Petty and son of series-dominator Richard Petty, was hired to drive the No. 21 car full-time. This formed a unique union between the two most successful racing families in NASCAR history.

This also marked the first addition of a new sponsor to the Wood Brothers team. A trio of corporate sponsors—7-Eleven, Citgo, and Chief Auto Parts—were brought on board with the Petty and the Wood Brothers for 1985. As part of their marketing strategy, the Wood Brothers were required to relinquish their world-famous No. 21 car number and adopt the No. 7 in favor of the 7-Eleven sponsorship. This led to a major discourse with fans of the team, who knew the No. 21 synonymous with the legendary team from Virginia.

This also marked the emergence of the second generation of Wood Brothers, Eddie, and Len, who had increased their responsibilities with the team over the past years. They effectively were now calling the shots on race day for the team, and an "anything goes" attitude was welcomed within the team.

Many of the older team members had retired by this time, including the original member and brother Delano Wood, who retired so he could focus on his emerging importance in his highly successful business with lumber. He also sought more time at home with his family and his church, as most races were held on Sunday and it provided little time for regular worship and church attendance with his family.

With an increasingly young team, a young driver, and a new sponsor, the Wood Brothers were trying to recapture their past glory. As time marched on through the 1970s and 1980s, many of the cutting-edge innovations pioneered by the team were discovered or were outright copied by other teams. Thus, the Woods' competitive edge had been dulled by other teams taking advantage of the Wood innovations and therefore, the Wood Brothers were enjoying a unique time of rebirth for the fabled NASCAR legends.

Kyle Petty would find victory in their second season together at Richmond Raceway in Richmond, Virginia. In 1987 the team returned to their traditional No. 21 and won the Coca-Cola 600 at Charlotte Motor Speedway. Just as the Petty-Wood relationship was beginning to bear fruit, Kyle Petty found himself lured to a new team, SABCO Racing, owned by the wealthy Felix Sabates. Unable to refuse the lucrative offer, Petty left the Wood Brothers after four seasons and 115 races together. They won two races and winnings surpassed $1.3 million.

Neil Bonnett (1989–1990)
After Petty's departure, and a brief three-race stint with substitute driver Tommy Ellis, the Wood Brothers hired their former driver Neil Bonnett to once again pilot the No. 21 car. This reunion was hailed as the possible cure for the Woods' launch back to the top of the sport. Both Bonnett and the Wood Brother were optimistic about what would occur in the future, and the chemistry from an earlier success still seemed evident.

After only 31 races together in only one full season and the start of a second, Bonnett, unfortunately, suffered serious injuries in a crash at Darlington Raceway. This left Bonnett wondering if he was able to race again, and he left the Wood team with an empty seat to be filled by Dale Jarrett.

The sponsorship shuffle had become commonplace during this period in all NASCAR teams. As Fortune 500 companies and other top names took notice of the massive value of NASCAR sponsorship, names like Pepsi, Mello Yello, Ford Motorcraft, and Procter & Gamble had signed big-dollar sponsorship deals with the top teams in the sport.

The face of the sport itself was also changing. Along with the full schedule and championship points races, a new breed of drivers, such as Darrell Waltrip, Dale Earnhardt, Bill Elliott, Rusty Wallace, Ricky Rudd, Terry Labonte, and Geoff Bodine, had already become powerful stars and champions. This era saw young drivers, including Davey Allison, Ward and Jeff Burton, Jeff Gordon, and Bobby Labonte, were emerging as the future of the sport as they worked up through the lower-ranked Busch Grand National Series.

New technologies and innovations began to dominate the sport too. NASCAR teams were quickly being run like corporations and sports franchises, with names like Hendrick Motorsports, Penske Racing, Roush Fenway Racing, SABCO, Larry Hedrick Motorsports, and Robert Yates Racing taking the dominance from Junior Johnson, the Melling's and the Petty's.

In efforts to keep up with the growth of NASCAR, the Wood Brothers continued to add more employees and assigned some personnel as shop employees and others as race-day crew members. The additions of team members like Bennie Belcher, Butch Mitchell, and outside engine builder Tommy Turner were bringing the team online with others in NASCAR.

Dale Jarrett (1990–1991)
By 1990, the Wood Brothers were back in the No. 21 Ford with Citgo as a sponsor. The early-season loss of Neil Bonnett required a replacement driver. Eddie and Len Wood turned to their old-time friend Dale Jarrett to take his rightful shot at the Winston Cup Series. Dale Jarrett was the son of former NASCAR champion and broadcaster Ned Jarrett and had grown up in the sport with the Wood Brothers.

The choice of Jarrett proved brilliant. In their first full season together in 1991, Jarrett would bring the Wood Brothers No. 21 to victory lane at Michigan, narrowly edging out Davey Allison by inches in one of the closest finishes in NASCAR history. The Wood team proved it still had what it took to win. More importantly, it would provide Jarrett with his first win and as a launching pad into one of the most successful careers in the modern era.

The Michigan victory supported a unique record for the Wood team. Every rookie driver who had ever driven for them for at least a full season had at least scored one victory in the No. 21 car. More impressive was that every driver to have driven for the Wood Brothers for a full season from 1953 to 2002 had won at least one race behind their wheel (although in one case, the win did not come in a points-paying race).

The Wood-Jarrett combination was widely considered to be as bright a future as any team in NASCAR's future; however, Jarrett was soon lured away by Washington Redskins coach Joe Gibbs, who formed a new team with the finances to entice Jarrett to leave the No. 21 car to drive the No. 18 Interstate Batteries Chevy. This new ride earned Jarrett his first Daytona 500 win.

Although Jarrett's time in the No. 21 was limited, lasting only for 53 races over two seasons, it produced one victory and over $600,000 in winnings. It also cemented how the Wood Brothers team was one of the best in NASCAR for breeding future superstars.

Morgan Shepherd (1992–1995)
With Jarrett's departure, the Woods sought out the veteran Morgan Shepherd to fill the seat in the 1992 season. Shepherd had been a solid, dependable finisher in the top series for most of his career and was a serious championship contender. With his consistent top finishes, Shepherd would provide strength as the team continued to adapt to the growing sport.

The new decade would seem unfathomable changes in NASCAR. A greater focus on new technology and sciences began to take hold. Engineers were now the norm, and the race-day teams often trained like professional athletes. Many teams even employed pro athletes to service their cars during pit stops.

The cost of racing grew exponentially, and its appeal doubled every year. NASCAR was now televised live internationally and was as popular as "stick and ball sports" with fans and advertisers.

Within the team itself, crew member turnover became frequent as Eddie and Len sought a perfect combination of chemistry to succeed. New members from nearby Mount Airy, North Carolina such as Rick Simmons and Mike "Andretti" Smith were added to the team. Paint and Body men Terry Hill and Chris Martin were hired, and longtime members Butch Moricle, Butch Mitchell, Hylton Tatum, and Cecil Wilson had become veterans on the team.

Glen Wood's daughter Kim had also emerged as a competent leader in her specialty with the team as well. In addition to running the business administrative aspects of the team, she was a "one-woman show" that handled all booking, reservations, accommodations, travel, and financial matters for the team. At a time when teams such as Richard Childress Racing employed a full-time staff of a dozen administrative workers, Kim proved as much a professional in this field as her brothers were in the mechanical and competitive aspects of the team.

Kim Wood had married crew member Terry Hall and became Kim Wood-Hall by this time. Terry Hall was a vital member of the team who served as a general mechanic and truck driver. He had replaced the legendary Delano Wood as jackman on the race day crew, after Delano's retirement several years earlier. Terry Hall was from Mount Airy and provided a gateway to recruiting many new members of the team from his ties to that area.

The No. 21 team continued many experiments and changes to again innovate the sport they helped build. They had been outsourcing much of their engine work, and during this period had contracted with Robert Yates Racing in an agreement to provide engine parts for the No. 21. They also began weight training routines for crew members and increased their application of technology in their race day competition.

Always the innovators in pit stops, the Wood team continued to practice and seek new improvements in their race day pit skills. The team also employed wide use of computers for the setup and timing of each car. Hiring race day specialists such as spotter Chuck Joyce; and part-time scorers/timers, the team was on the cutting edge of competition development.

It was in this period of the early 1990s that Eddie and Len Wood, and Kim Wood-Hall each took an ownership position in the team. For several years, the team had been owned by the Glen Wood Company, with patriarch Glen controlling the team's destiny. Longtime co-founder and crew chief Leonard Wood had stepped down as crew chief many years earlier, and Eddie Wood had become official crew chief of the No. 21 Ford.

Morgan Shepherd would do very well with the No. 21 Citgo-sponsored car, and would provide consistent finishes in all four seasons he ran for the Wood Brothers. They enjoyed 52 Top Ten finishes and over $4 million in earnings in their time together. Their only victory came at Atlanta Motor Speedway in March 1993, a race that was delayed six days because of a snowstorm in the Atlanta area the previous weekend, and provided a much-needed boost for the team who had suffered drought since Jarrett's victory at Michigan.

Michael Waltrip (1996–1998)
With the 1996 season upon them, the Woods sought a younger driver to fill the seat of the No. 21 Ford. As Shepherd was approaching retirement age, and a youth trend had risen with drivers like Jeff Gordon, the team was looking to ride a similar wave. They parted ways with Shepherd and welcomed Michael Waltrip, the younger brother of 3-time series champion and 1989 Daytona 500 winner Darrell Waltrip.

Although they produced no official regular-season victory, Waltrip and the Wood Brothers pulled off an amazing win at the 1996 The Winston Select All-Star race. In their first season with Waltrip, the team brought home the victory that night in a stunning display of team excellence that secured a $200,000 purse for the race.

In Waltrip's 3-season, 95-race tenure with the Woods, they would amass over $3.7 million in winnings.

Elliott Sadler (1999–2002)
With the dawn of the 1999 season, the Wood Brothers brought in Elliott Sadler to replace a departing Michael Waltrip. Like the Woods, Sadler is a Virginia native whose family had been involved in racing for many years. Sadler represented a young, talented Rookie looking to make a name for himself in the Winston Cup Series. With their reputation as prime developers of new talent, many held great things for this combination.

Changes inside the No. 21 team would become pivotal during this period as well. After decades at their old shop location at Dobyns Road in Stuart, the Wood Brothers constructed a massive, state-of-the-art new facility at the Industrial Park in that town. This new facility was modern and spacious and offered room for the expansion and development of their ever-growing team.

This new home also offered a museum of Wood Brothers memorabilia and history. Glen Wood's wife Bernice, who had served as de facto archivist for the family and team since the 1950s, presented a treasure trove of history for race fans to enjoy. She and Kim dedicated many long hours to perfecting the museum and offered guided tours of the entire facility to visitors from around the world. This delighted fans and quickly became known as one of the best and most visitor-friendly locations for any NASCAR fan to visit.

Additional changes emerged in personnel as some left, while others were hired. A full-time secretarial assistant, Annpaige Bowles, had been hired a few years earlier to assist in the demanding office work and take care of the museum. Previous hires such as William Fulp, John Ilowiecki, and Barry Sheppard had been brought in to expand the force to include parts managers, couriers, engineers, and shock specialists. A Chassis dyno, shock dyno, and other new equipment were added.

Also among the recent hires was legendary engine builder Danny Glad. Glad had worked on the 1992 Paul Andrews-led Alan Kulwicki team several years earlier, and came to the Woods after leaving Geoff Bodine. Along with notables such as Randy Dorton and Lou Larosa, Danny Glad was regarded as one of the best engine specialists in the sport.

Young Elliott Sadler cut his teeth in the No. 21 car and was soon performing on par with the best in the top NASCAR circuit. Eddie and Len had brought in Crew Chief Mike Beam, marking a historic first time that someone outside the Wood family had served as Crew Chief for the No. 21 team. Beam had seen success with Junior Johnson, Bud Moore, and others before arriving at the Woods. His pairing with Sadler would also allow Eddie and Len more time to manage the overall growth of their ever-expanding business operations.

2000 marked a historic period for Wood Brothers Racing. They celebrated their 50th anniversary in a special ceremony honoring their milestone achievements. For a team of brothers, relatives, and friends from the tiny town of Stuart (located in the Blue Ridge Mountains) they had achieved international acclaim as pioneers in motorsport competition. That same year, brothers Glen Wood and Leonard Wood were inducted into the prestigious Motorsports Hall of Fame of America.

On the track, the Sadler-Wood combination began to bear fruit in the 2001 season, with Sadler scoring his first win in the No. 21 Ford at Bristol Motor Speedway This win oddly was the first win for the Wood Brothers in their career at Bristol, and the first for them in eight years. For many years, Bristol was not raced by the team, mostly because their focus was on the superspeedways, and they did not race at short tracks.

This period also saw an increased relationship between Wood Brothers racing and Roush Fenway Racing, headed by engine master Jack Roush of Michigan. Roush fielded several top-notch teams including those driven by Jeff Burton and Mark Martin. This Wood-Roush relationship gave the Wood Brothers the depth of engineering and engine resources that most multi-car teams relied upon to dominate the sport. This limited arrangement allowed the Woods a wide array of specialists and research to aid in their quest for victory.

Elliott Sadler continued to improve with the No. 21 and his evolution was quickly making him a target for other teams. As proven in the past, the Woods were excellent breeders of talent and had invested massive amounts of time and dedication to bringing Sadler to the forefront. After the 2002 season, Sadler moved to the Robert Yates Racing stable. The Sadler period for the Wood team had lasted 139 races, which was the longest single stretch for a pilot of the No. 21 since David Pearson drove in the Wood's heyday. Sadler and the Woods earned one victory together at Bristol Motor Speedway, and over $9 million in only four seasons together.

During Sadler's time in the No. 21, the long-term sponsorship relationship between Wood Brothers Racing and Citgo Petroleum came to an end. This was the end of a historic run, as Citgo had been a sponsor on the Wood Brothers car for nearly 20 years. Citgo was replaced by Ford Motorcraft and the United States Air Force, which made the Wood Brothers team the de facto "factory team" for Ford Motor Company.

The next generation emerges
Eddie Wood and his wife Carol have two children, a daughter Jordan, and son Jonathan. Jordan was quickly gaining success as a rising beauty queen in local and regional pageants and an award-winning competitive dancer with the Patrick County Dancing Arts Center. Jordan also would spend free time at the Wood Brothers racing office, assisting with administrative duties and working to learn the team's business operations. Eddie and Carol's son Jonathan began following in the family's footsteps as a competitive racer.

Jon Wood was finding victory in his grandfather's footsteps as a driver, racing go-kart in the World Karting Series and other forms of racing. Many were already speculating on his future in NASCAR and with the Wood Brothers team. Currently, he serves as the company's Senior Vice President, overseeing the company's merchandise operations and actively participating in the day-to-day management of the team.

Ricky Rudd (2003–2005)

Veteran driver and Virginia native Ricky Rudd, formerly at Robert Yates Racing, moved to Sadler's old seat. His first season with the team in 2003 saw five impressive top-ten finishes and over $3 million in winnings. Rudd pulled off a second-place finish nearly winning in his first year behind the wheel of the No. 21 car.

Eddie and Len Wood continued to seek the right mix of crew members and chemistry, shuffling through personnel and crew chiefs to finally hire Michael "Fatback" McSwain as Crew Chief of the No. 21 Motorcraft-sponsored Ford. McSwain and Rudd had worked together while at Robert Yates Racing several years prior.

Meanwhile, the young Jon Wood continued blistering short tracks across the South and Mid-Atlantic in the Late Model Stock Series and Craftsman Truck Series. Wood raced for owner Jack Roush and was quickly earning a reputation as a "racer" and not just a "driver" with his hard-charging style and mature evolution into a competitive force.

Young Keven Wood, also began his racing career in this period. The son of Len and Nancy Wood, he had begun his academic studies in Motorsports Technology at Patrick & Henry Community College while also working at the family's race shop. Keven absorbed everything about racing, from car chassis set up to engine tuning, to add to his knowledge of racing. He began his tenure as a Driver in 2002 in the Legends Series and quickly burned up every track he drove upon. His talents proved formidable, and his victories were hard-won. In 2004, Keven began running in the Late Model Stock Series, a tough proving ground for emerging champions.

The 2004 Series was a success for the Wood Brothers, but times were again changing. R.J. Reynolds had been forced to withdraw the sponsorship from NASCAR several years earlier due to tobacco company lawsuits, and the top series was now known as the Nextel Cup Series. The expense of operating a team had reached all-time highs, requiring as much as $10 million per year from corporate sponsors just to field a car for a season.

In 2004, the Wood Brothers left their roots in Stuart to locate their main base of operations near Charlotte, North Carolina. As every competitive team is based in the area, the Woods knew it was a difficult yet necessary move if they hoped to achieve their quest for the Sprint Cup. Their re-location to Mooresville, North Carolina allowed them more resources and greater access to personnel and technology in the hub of NASCAR racing. As expected, many shifts in team composition occurred.

The Woods maintained their shop in Stuart although it is used primarily as a museum and as a secondary facility to their main operations in North Carolina.

Rudd and the Wood Brothers enjoyed a successful run in 2004, again nearly winning and taking home a second-place slot. They also won a pole position, the team's first since 1984 with Buddy Baker in the No. 21.

The 2005 season saw another second-place finish for Rudd in the No. 21 at Sonoma. They also enjoyed over $4 million in winnings. At the end of the 2005 season, Ricky Rudd announced his retirement. He stepped down after only three seasons with the Wood Brothers during a period of tremendous change for the team.

Ken Schrader (2006–2007)

The Woods announced that veteran Ken Schrader would drive the No. 21 in 2006, with new primary sponsorship from Little Debbie Snack Cakes supporting the team. The United States Air Force would remain as an associate sponsor along with Motorcraft, and all three rotated primary sponsorship duties throughout the season.

A tremendous shift towards the future in the Wood Brothers Racing Team was announced in 2005. The team had entered into a partnership agreement with JTG Racing based in NC to begin with the 2006 season.

JTG Motorsports was spawned from ST Racing, which fields entries in the Craftsman Truck Series and Busch Series. It is owned by Tad and Jodi Geschickter.

Among the changes to the No. 21 team was the elevation of Michael "Fatback" McSwain from crew chief to the manager of racing operations for the team. The crew chief hired for the 2006 campaign was David Hyder, who worked with Schrader at BAM Racing.

In addition to the No. 21 Nextel Cup entry driven by Ken Schrader, JTG Racing fielded the Busch Series No. 47 Clorox Ford Taurus driven by Jon Wood and the No. 59 Kingsford/Bush's Baked Beans Ford Taurus driven by Stacy Compton.

Bill Elliott (2007–2010)

In 2007, Schrader and young Jon Wood planned to split time in the No. 21 car. Wood made one of the two races he attempted before he was pulled from both the No. 21 and his No. 47 Busch car for medical issues. Meanwhile, 1988 champion Bill Elliott was brought on due to qualifying and sponsorship issues. The sponsors stayed the same from 2006, and the Wood Brothers entered a second car numbered 47 (JTG racing's car number) into two events, at Las Vegas with Schrader and Kansas with Jon. Both drivers failed to qualify for their respective events.

In 2008, Elliott, Marcos Ambrose, and Jon shared driving responsibilities of the No. 21. Ambrose, the driver of the JTG No. 59, had signed on to the partial schedule before the two teams ended their partnership. He had a best finish of third at Watkins Glen, and a strong run in his first race at Sonoma. He would begin running part-time the JTG No. 47 at Indy, and would leave the Wood Brothers once JTG switched to Toyota, taking sponsor Little Debbie with him. Jon Wood competed in two races, with Elliott doing 24, with a best finish of 12th.

In 2009, the Wood Brothers ran a partial schedule, competing in only 13 races due to Air Force and Little Debbie moving to other teams, leaving only Ford sponsoring with their Motorcraft brand. The season included four Top-10 qualifying efforts, including a season-best fourth at Indianapolis. The Motorcraft Ford Fusion driven by Bill Elliott also had four Top-16 finishes and the team accumulated over $1.3 million in earnings.

2010 returned the Wood Brothers to the racetrack as they celebrated 60 years in NASCAR. They returned to Daytona in February looking for their fifth Daytona 500 victory with Bill Elliott behind the wheel of the Motorcraft Ford Fusion. Quick Lane Tire and Auto Centers has also come on board for the 2010 season as a sponsor. Elliott competed in eleven races that season. Roush Fenway Racing development driver Trevor Bayne made his Sprint Cup debut with the Wood Brothers that year in the AAA Texas 500 on November 7.

Trevor Bayne (2011–2014)

In 2011, Bayne became the youngest driver in Wood Brothers history, taking over duties of piloting the No. 21 in at least 17 races including the first five races of the season. Bayne had a very strong debut in the Cup Series in 2010, with the No. 21 team finishing on the lead lap in 17th position at Texas Motor Speedway. Motorcraft/Quick Lane continued to sponsor the team through the 2011 season. On February 20, one day after his 20th birthday, Bayne won the 2011 Daytona 500. It was the first win for Wood Brothers Racing since Sadler at Bristol during the 2001 season. The win brought additional sponsorship for several races from Camping World/Good Sam, including the All-Star Race. Ricky Stenhouse Jr. replaced his Roush teammate at the Coca-Cola 600, when Bayne was diagnosed with what was thought to be Lyme disease, but later revealed to be multiple sclerosis.

The team lost the extra sponsorship for 2012, except for the All-Star Race in which Camping World/Good Sam returned to the car. For the rest of the season, the car ran a limited schedule with Bayne, carrying the Ford Motorcraft/Quick Lane sponsorship.

Bayne continued to run a limited schedule in both 2013 and 2014, but the team failed to return to victory lane. It was later announced that Bayne would compete in Roush Fenway Racing's No. 6 Cup car full-time in 2015.

Ryan Blaney (2015–2017)

Ryan Blaney was announced as the No. 21 driver in 2015, with an alliance between the Woods and Team Penske. The best result for the team was fourth at the Talladega spring race. The team's performance improved enough that, despite qualifying for just 16 races (in 19 attempts, an increase from their 12-race schedules in 2013 and 2014), they were able to finish 41st in owner points; this placed them ahead of the No. 32, No. 26 and No. 62, which all attempted the full schedule. Blaney returned to the team in 2016 for a full-time run, the team's first since 2008 and the first with one driver since 2006. He scored nine top 10s and finished 20th in points.

In December 2016, it was announced that Go Fas Racing leased their charter to Wood Brothers Racing, guaranteeing the No. 21 a starting spot in every race of the 2017 season. Blaney started the season with a runner-up in the 2017 Daytona 500 won by fellow Ford driver Kurt Busch. Blaney then nearly won the spring race in Texas, leading a race-high 148 laps until a pit road mishap kept him from winning the race. Blaney also led two of the three stages in the race, Blaney also came close to winning the spring race in Kansas after winning the pole, Blaney also won Stage 2 that race, but ended up finishing fourth. Blaney won his first career Cup race at the Axalta presents the Pocono 400, the Wood Brothers' first win since the 2011 Daytona 500, beating second-place driver Kevin Harvick. It was a very popular win, with competitors flanking the 21 in respect and joy on the cool-down lap. With 14 top 10s, Blaney reached the Round of 8 in the playoffs and finished 9th in points. 

Paul Menard (2018–2019)

On July 26, 2017, it was announced that in 2018 Blaney would move over to a third Penske car and in exchange, Paul Menard would move from Richard Childress Racing to the No. 21 car with sponsor Menards as part of a deal with Penske. He scored seven top 10s, including a 5th finish at the Michigan June race, and ended up 19th in the drivers' classification.

Team co-founder Glen Wood died at the age of 93 on January 18, 2019. Menard scored just four top 10s and repeated a 19th place in points.

Matt DiBenedetto (2020–2021)

On July 12, 2019, Menard announced he had a contract for the 2020 season, indicating that he plans to stay with Wood Brothers. On September 10, Menard announced he will retire from full-time racing after the 2019 season. At the same time, Wood Brothers Racing announced Matt DiBenedetto as his replacement for the 2020 season. On July 15, 2020, DiBenedetto won the All-Star Open and qualified for the team’s third-ever All-Star Race. DiBenedetto placed 13th in the main event. In coordination with Penske, the team announced that DiBenedetto would drive the car in 2021 and would then be replaced by Austin Cindric in 2022. On December 30, 2020, Bob Pockrass reported that Wood Brothers Racing purchased the charter they had leased from Go Fas Racing since 2017. 

Harrison Burton (2022–present)

On July 15, 2021, it was confirmed that Matt DiBenedetto will not be returning to Wood Brothers Racing in 2022. That same day, Harrison Burton was announced as DiBenedetto's replacement.

Craftsman Truck Series

Truck No. 19 history
Note: Michael "Fatback" McSwain is listed as the owner in that race.

The team only ran one race with Kelly Bires driving the No. 19 truck at Atlanta in 2006. He started 29th and finished 19th.

Truck No. 20 history
The No. 20 truck debuted in 2006 with sponsorship from the United States Air Force, in a partnership with JTG Racing, Jon Wood started driving at Daytona and Fontana, finishing 16th and ninth. Bobby East drove one race at Atlanta where he finished 23rd. JTG Racing's development driver Marcos Ambrose drove for the remainder of the season. In 2007, the No. 20 was renumbered to No. 09 with Joey Clanton and Stacy Compton sharing the ride.

Truck No. 21 history
The No. 21 truck debuted with sponsorship from Edy's Ice Cream and State Fair Corn Dogs at Daytona in 2006 with Stacy Compton behind the wheel for the first two races. After Jon Wood handled driving duties at Atlanta, Bobby East drove the truck for the remainder of the season, posting a best finish of eleventh. East was not retained for the 2007 season, and the team planned to run development driver Kelly Bires in nineteen races, with Mark Martin driving the remaining six races. Late in the season, Bires moved up to the Busch Series, replacing Jon Wood, who took his spot in the 21 truck. Jon and Keven Wood shared the No. 21 truck in 2008 with sponsorship from the United States Air Force. In December 2008, Keven Wood said in an interview that the team had shut down its Truck operation due to lack of sponsorship.

Indianapolis 500
As the Wood Brothers Racing Team gained notoriety throughout NASCAR racing for their work in the pits, other racers in varying forms of motorsports took notice. Soon, the efficient pit stop was all the rage in other forms of auto racing contests.

In 1965, the IndyCar teams took heed. Lotus owner Colin Chapman hired the Wood Brothers to service his car, driven by his Scottish Formula One ace Jim Clark, during pit stops in the 1965 Indianapolis 500. This marked the first time a NASCAR stock car crew had ever provided such service for an IndyCar team. During the race, Clark was able to increase his track position and drove into victory lane as the winner of the 500, with the Wood Brothers as his crew.

Legacy
The Wood Brothers hold many records and historic achievements. Among these are the fact that they have fielded only Ford Motor Company products since 1950, which makes the second-longest association of any motorsports team with a single manufacturer, behind Scuderia Ferrari. The Wood Brothers also have won at least one race in every decade for the last six decades, an unmatched feat. They have 99 total points-paying victories and have won 119 pole positions in 1,606 starts. They have earned over $30 million in career winnings, and remain among the winningest racing teams in NASCAR history. Also, after Petty Enterprises merged with Gillett Evernham Motorsports to form Richard Petty Motorsports, the Wood Brothers became the oldest team in NASCAR.

The Wood Brothers were inducted into the Motorsports Hall of Fame of America in 2000.

Motorsports career results

NASCAR
(key) (Bold – Pole position awarded by qualifying time. Italics – Pole position earned by points standings or practice time. * – Most laps led.)

Car No. 21 results

Footnotes

References

Further reading

External links

American auto racing teams
Companies based in North Carolina
NASCAR teams
Auto racing teams established in 1950